This is a list of municipalities in Canada which have standing links to local communities in other countries known as "town twinning" (usually in Europe) or "sister cities" (usually in the rest of the world).

A
Abbotsford
 Fukagawa, Japan

Armstrong
 Rathfriland, Northern Ireland, United Kingdom

Ashcroft
 Bifuka, Japan

Aurora
 Leksand, Sweden

B
Barrhead

 Chapala, Mexico
 Drouin (Baw Baw), Australia
 Kitami, Japan

Barrie

 Harrogate, England, United Kingdom
 Taizhou, China
 Zweibrücken, Germany

Beaconsfield
 Verneuil-sur-Seine, France

Belleville

 Gunpo, South Korea
 Lahr, Germany
 Zhucheng, China

Blainville
 Chambéry, France

Bouctouche
 St. Martinville, United States

Bracebridge
 Gol, Norway

Brampton terminated all its twinnings.

Brantford

 Kamianets-Podilskyi, Ukraine
 Ostrów Wielkopolski, Poland

Brockville
 Ontario, United States

Bromont
 Cabourg, France

Burlington

 Apeldoorn, Netherlands
 Itabashi (Tokyo), Japan

Burnaby

 Hwaseong, South Korea
 Kushiro, Japan
 Mesa, United States
 Zhongshan, China

C
Calgary

 Daejeon, South Korea
 Daqing, China
 Jaipur, India
 Naucalpan de Juárez, Mexico
 Phoenix, United States
 Quebec City, Canada

Campbell River
 Ishikari, Japan

Camrose

 Kamifurano, Japan
 Kentville, Canada
 Saguenay, Canada
 Warwick (Southern Downs), Australia
 Yichun, China

Canmore
 Higashikawa, Japan

Cantley
 Ornans, France

Cape Breton

 Dalian, China
 Givenchy-en-Gohelle, France
 Wałbrzych, Poland

Cap-Pelé
 Broussard, United States

Carleton Place

 Comrie, Scotland, United Kingdom
 Franklin, United States

Castlegar

 Enbetsu, Japan
 Stephenville, Canada
 Yueyang, China

Cavan Monaghan
 Monaghan, Ireland

Charlottetown
 Ashibetsu, Japan

Châteauguay

 Cambrai, France
 Châteaugay, France
 Moose Jaw, Canada

Chatham-Kent

 Bielawa, Poland
 Gangbuk (Seoul), South Korea
 Harpers Ferry, United States

Cobourg
 Coburg, Germany

Cold Lake
 Hügelsheim, Germany

Collingwood

 Boone, United States
 Katano, Japan
 Zihuatanejo, Mexico

Coquitlam

 Paju, South Korea

Cornwall
 Coventry, England, United Kingdom

Côte Saint-Luc
 Ashkelon, Israel

Cranbrook
 Coeur d'Alene, United States

D
Didsbury
 Miki, Japan

Dieppe

 Carencro, United States
 Dieppe, France

Drummondville

 Braine-l'Alleud, Belgium
 Kochersberg (communauté), France
 La Roche-sur-Yon, France

E
Edmonton

 Gatineau, Canada
 Harbin, China
 Nashville, United States
 Wonju, South Korea

G
Gimli
 Akureyri, Iceland

Goderich
 Bay City, United States

Granby

 Carrefour, Haiti
 Coventry, England, United Kingdom
 Hammam-Lif, Tunisia
 Windsor, Canada

Grand Forks
 Spremberg, Germany

Grande Prairie
 Mazatlán, Mexico

Greater Sudbury
 Kokkola, Finland

Guelph

 Castelfranco Veneto, Italy
 Loria, Italy
 Treviso, Italy

H
Halifax

 Campeche, Mexico
 Hakodate, Japan
 Norfolk, United States
 Zhuhai, China

Halton Hills
 Wenjiang (Chengdu), China

Hamilton

 Abruzzo, Italy
 Flint, United States
 Fukuyama, Japan
 Ma'anshan, China
 Mangalore, India
 Monterrey, Mexico
 Racalmuto, Italy

 Shawinigan, Canada

Hampstead
 Kiryat Shmona, Israel

Hanna
 Wake, Japan

Hinton
 Wanouchi, Japan

Hope
 Izu, Japan

I
Iqaluit
 Qeqqata, Greenland

J
Jasper
 Hakone, Japan

Joliette
 Brive-la-Gaillarde, France

K
Kamloops
 Uji, Japan

Kawartha Lakes
 Nayoro, Japan

Kelowna
 Kasugai, Japan

Kenora
 Shimokawa, Japan

Kentville

 Camrose, Canada
 Castel di Sangro, Italy

Kimberley
 Annaka, Japan

Kingston

 Cienfuegos, Cuba
 Scottsdale, United States

Kingsville
 Westlake, United States

L
Lacombe
 Rikubetsu, Japan

Lac-Mégantic 

 Dourdan, France
 Farmington, United States

Lake Cowichan
 Date, Japan 

Laval

 Botoșani, Romania
 Klagenfurt, Austria
 Laval, France
 Manila, Philippines
 Nice, France
 Pedro Aguirre Cerda, Chile
 Ribeira Grande, Portugal
 San Salvador, El Salvador

Lethbridge

 Anyang, China
 Culver City, United States
 Great Falls, United States
 Saint-Laurent (Montreal), Canada
 Timashyovsk, Russia
 Towada, Japan

Lévis
 Le Grand-Quevilly, France

London
 Nanjing, China

Longueuil

 Lafayette, United States
 Whitby, Canada

Lorraine
 Saint-Dié-des-Vosges, France

M
Markham

 Cary, United States
 Nördlingen, Germany
 Wuhan, China

Mirabel
 Châlons-en-Champagne, France

Miramichi
 Monaghan, Ireland

Mission
 Oyama, Japan

Mississauga
 Kariya, Japan

Moncton

 Lafayette, United States
 North Bay, Canada

Montreal

 Algiers, Algeria
 Antananarivo, Madagascar
 Athens, Greece
 Busan, South Korea

 Hiroshima, Japan
 Lucknow, India
 Lyon, France
 Montréal-la-Cluse, France
 Rio de Janeiro, Brazil
 Shanghai, China
 Tunis, Tunisia
 Yerevan, Armenia

N
Nanaimo

 Haikou, China
 Saitama, Japan

Nanton
 Senantes, France

Nelson

 Baie-Saint-Paul, Canada
 Izu, Japan
 Kaoma District, Zambia

Neuville
 Neuville-de-Poitou, France

New Westminster

 Lijiang, China
 Moriguchi, Japan
 Quezon City, Philippines

North Bay
 Moncton, Canada

North Vancouver

 Chiba, Japan
 Huizhou, China

O
Oakville

 Dorval, Canada
 Huai'an, China
 Neyagawa, Japan

Oliver
 Bandai, Japan

Ottawa

 Beijing, China
 Catania, Italy

Owen Sound

 Dayi County, China
 Miamisburg, United States
 Ocho Rios, Jamaica

P
Penticton
 Ikeda, Japan

Perth

 Asago, Japan
 Perth, Scotland, United Kingdom

Peterborough

 Ann Arbor, United States
 Monaghan, Ireland

Port Alberni
 Abashiri, Japan

Port Hardy
 Numata, Japan

Prince Albert
 Jilin City, China

Prince George
 Maardu, Estonia

Prince Rupert

 Cangzhou, China
 Ketchikan, United States
 Owase, Japan

Princeville
 Saint-M'Hervé, France

Q
Quebec City

 Bordeaux, France
 Calgary, Canada
 Namur, Belgium
 Xi'an, China

Quesnel
 Shiraoi, Japan

R
Regina
 Jinan, China

Renews-Cappahayden
 Athenry, Ireland

Repentigny
 Bergerac, France

Richmond

 Pierrefonds-Roxboro (Montreal), Canada
 Wakayama, Japan
 Xiamen, China

Richmond Hill

 Lakeland, United States
 Netanya, Israel
 Shijiazhuang, China

S
Saguenay

 Angoulême, France
 Camrose, Canada

Saint John

 Bangor, United States
 Donghae, South Korea
 Newport, United States
 Shantou, China

Saint-Lambert

 La Flèche, France
 Vernon, Canada

Saint-Sulpice
 Saint-Jean-d'Angély, France

Saint-Valentin
 Rikubetsu, Japan

Sainte-Adèle
 Mingguang, China

Sainte-Agathe-des-Monts

 Lagny-sur-Marne, France
 Saranac Lake, United States

Sainte-Brigitte-de-Laval
 Yerres, France

Sainte-Thérèse

 Annecy, France
 Lagoa, Portugal

Salaberry-de-Valleyfield

 Combs-la-Ville, France

 Penglai (Yantai), China
 Safi, Morocco

Salmon Arm
 Inashiki, Japan

Saskatoon

 Chernivtsi, Ukraine
 Shijiazhuang, China
 Umeå, Sweden

Sault Ste. Marie

 Forssa, Finland
 Maia, Portugal
 Sault Ste. Marie, United States

Shawinigan

 Chambéry, France
 Hamilton, Canada

Sherbrooke
 Montpellier, France

Shippagan
 Loudun, France

Sidney

 Anacortes, United States
 Cairns, Australia
 Niimi, Japan

Sooke
 Port Townsend, United States

Sparwood
 Kamisunagawa, Japan

Squamish
 Shimizu, Japan

Stony Plain
 Shikaoi, Japan

St. Catharines
 Port of Spain, Trinidad and Tobago

St. John's
 Waterford, Ireland

St. Thomas

 Bowling Green, United States
 Xuyi, China

Summerland
 Toyokoro, Japan

Summerside
 Stirling, Scotland, United Kingdom

Surrey

 Kōtō (Tokyo), Japan
 Zhuhai, China

T
Taber
 Higashiōmi, Japan

Tecumseh

 Frosinone, Italy
 Oldcastle, Ireland
 Tecumseh, United States

Terrebonne
 Vitré, France

Thunder Bay

 Duluth, United States
 Gifu, Japan
 Jiaozuo, China
 Little Canada, United States
 Seinäjoki, Finland

Tillsonburg
 Hengshui, China

Timmins
 Naoshima, Japan

Toronto

 Chicago, United States
 Chongqing, China
 Frankfurt am Main, Germany
 Milan, Italy

Trois-Rivières
 Tours, France

V
Vancouver

 Edinburgh, Scotland, United Kingdom
 Guangzhou, China
 Los Angeles, United States
 Odesa, Ukraine
 Yokohama, Japan

Varennes
 El Jadida, Morocco

Vaughan

 Baguio, Philippines
 Delia, Italy
 Lanciano, Italy
 Ramla, Israel
 Sanjō, Japan
 Sora, Italy
 Yangzhou, China

Vegreville

 Kolomyia Raion, Ukraine
 Stryi, Ukraine

Vernon

 Anandpur Sahib, India
 Frankenburg am Hausruck, Austria
 Modesto, United States
 Saint-Lambert, Canada
 Tavullia, Italy
 Tome, Japan

Victoria

 Morioka, Japan
 Napier, New Zealand
 Suzhou, China

Victoriaville
 Colomiers, France

W
Wetaskiwin
 Ashoro, Japan

Whistler
 Karuizawa, Japan

Whitby

 Longueuil, Canada
 Whitby, England, United Kingdom

White Rock
 Imperial Beach, United States

Whitecourt
 Yūbetsu, Japan

Whitehorse

 Juneau, United States
 Lancieux, France
 Ushiku, Japan

Windsor

 Changchun, China
 Coventry, England, United Kingdom
 Fujisawa, Japan
 Granby, Canada
 Gunsan, South Korea
 Lublin, Poland
 Mannheim, Germany
 Las Vueltas, El Salvador
 Ohrid, North Macedonia
 Saint-Étienne, France
 Saltillo, Mexico
 Udine, Italy

Winnipeg

 Beersheba, Israel
 Chengdu, China
 Jinju, South Korea
 Kuopio, Finland
 Lviv, Ukraine
 Manila, Philippines
 Minneapolis, United States
 Reykjavík, Iceland
 San Nicolás de los Garza, Mexico
 Setagaya (Tokyo), Japan
 Taichung, Taiwan

Woodstock

 Pesche, Italy
 Sylvania, United States

Y
Yellowknife terminated all its twinnings.

References

Canada
Lists of cities in Canada
Lists of populated places in Canada
Foreign relations of Canada
Populated places in Canada